Mira Canton is a canton of Ecuador, located in Carchi Province. Its capital is the town of Mira. Its population in the 2001 census was 12,919 and was 12,180 in the 2010 census.

The canton is located in the Andes and western foothills of the Andes on the upper tributaries of the Mira River.

The parishes in the canton are Concepción, Jijón y Caamańo, Juan Montalvo (San Ignacio de Quil), and Mira (Chontahuasi).

Demographics
Ethnic groups as of the Ecuadorian census of 2010:
Mestizo  62.7%
Afro-Ecuadorian  32.0%
Indigenous  2.7%
White  2.2%
Montubio  0.3%
Other  0.0%

References

Cantons of Carchi Province